Women on the Edge (German: Frauen am Abgrund) is a 1929 German silent drama film directed by Georg Jacoby and starring Gustav Diessl, Elga Brink and Inge Landgut. Paul Hörbiger notably played the part of a Jewish Impresario Siegfried Nürnberger.

Cast
 Gustav Diessl as Robert Stevens 
 Elga Brink as Maria Stevens 
 Inge Landgut as Inge, Kind 
 André Roanne as Harry Bernd 
 Valerie Boothby as Lilly Bernd 
 Livio Pavanelli as Mario Giorgini, Kammersänger 
 Paul Hörbiger as Siegfried Nürnberger, sein Impresario 
 Ibolya Szekely as Rosy, eine Stenotypistin 
 Arthur Duarte

References

Bibliography
 Prawer, S.S. Between Two Worlds: The Jewish Presence in German and Austrian Film, 1910-1933. Berghahn Books, 2005.

External links

1929 films
1929 drama films
German drama films
Films of the Weimar Republic
German silent feature films
Films directed by Georg Jacoby
Bavaria Film films
German black-and-white films
Silent drama films
1920s German films